Alucita danunciae is a moth of the family Alucitidae. It was described by Vargas in 2011. It is found in Chile, where it is only known from the Azapa valley in the Arica Province.

The larvae feed on the seeds and fruit of Tecoma fulva fulva.

References

Moths described in 2011
Alucitidae
Moths of South America
Endemic fauna of Chile